Marino Pušić (born 18 August 1971) is a Croatian retired footballer working as an assistant manager of Eredivisie club Feyenoord. As a player and a manager he was also active in futsal.

Playing career

Club
As a player, Pušić played for De Graafschap, VV Rheden, 1. FC Köln II, and KAS Eupen.

He was part of the Red Star Belgrade squad that won the 1990–91 European Cup, but was still you young to feature in any of their games. After fleeing the Yugoslav Wars for Holland he rejected a move to Croatia Zagreb in 1999 when he played for Dutch Hoofdklasse side Babberich. Pušić later became a club legend at Babberich, when he scored both goals in the 1996 Dutch Amateur Cup final against SHO in De Kuip.

Managerial career
Pušić was a trainer in the Vitesse/AGOVV Football Academy and assistant-manager with NAC Breda, Inter Baku en FC Twente.

On 18 October 2017, he was appointed interim manager at FC Twente after his predecessor René Hake was forced to leave. On 29 October 2017, Gertjan Verbeek was presented as the new manager, after which Pušić fell back in his role as assistant manager. On 26 March 2018, he was promoted to the interim manager position again, as Verbeek was fired. As interim head coach, Pušić failed to save FC Twente's season and finished last in the Eredivisie, thus relegating to the Eerste Divisie. As of the 2018–19 season, Pušić was promoted to head coach.

After finishing in first place and becoming the champions of the Eerste Divisie, and thus securing promotion back to the Eredivisie, Pušić was sacked on 7 May 2019. He was then recruited to become the assistant manager for AZ Alkmaar in May 2019.

In January 2021, Feyenoord announced to have signed Pušić as assistant-manager, starting in the summer of 2021. As manager Arne Slot was previously sent away by AZ Alkmaar for negotiating with Feyenoord, Pušić was sent away by AZ Alkmaar as well.

Honours
FC Twente
Eerste Divisie: 2018–19

References 

1971 births
Living people
Croats of Bosnia and Herzegovina
Sportspeople from Mostar
Association football midfielders
Bosnia and Herzegovina footballers
Dutch footballers
De Graafschap players
Red Star Belgrade footballers
FK Velež Mostar players
1. FC Köln II players
K.A.S. Eupen players
Vierde Divisie players
Expatriate footballers in the Netherlands
Expatriate footballers in Germany
Expatriate footballers in Belgium
Dutch football managers
FC Twente managers
Eredivisie managers
Eerste Divisie managers
FC Twente non-playing staff
AZ Alkmaar non-playing staff
NAC Breda non-playing staff
AGOVV Apeldoorn non-playing staff